"Today's Lonely Fool" is a song written by Kenny Beard and Stan Paul Davis, and recorded by American country music artist Tracy Lawrence. It was released in February 1992 as the second single from his debut album, Sticks and Stones. The song peaked at number 3 on the U.S. Billboard Hot Country Songs chart and number 2 on Canada's RPM country chart.

Content
The song is a moderate mid-tempo song where the narrator is begging forgiveness of a woman he did wrong because he didn't trust her fidelity. He tells her that yesterday he was a jealous man but today he is just a lonely fool. The second verse is half spoken, half sung. The narrator says that if she takes him back, he will always trust her and be proud when other men notice her.

Music video
The music video was directed by Marc Ball and premiered in March 1992.

Chart performance

Year-end charts

References

1992 singles
Tracy Lawrence songs
Song recordings produced by James Stroud
Atlantic Records singles
Songs written by Kenny Beard
1991 songs